Maytown is an unincorporated community  located in south Volusia County, Florida, United States. The community was the site of the crossing of the Enterprise Branch and Kissimmee Valley Branch of the Florida East Coast Railway. Today, both lines are rail trails.

References

Unincorporated communities in Volusia County, Florida
Unincorporated communities in Florida